In enzymology, a 24-hydroxycholesterol 7alpha-hydroxylase is an enzyme that catalyzes the chemical reaction

(24R)-cholest-5-ene-3beta,24-diol + NADPH + H+ + O2  (24R)-cholest-5-ene-3beta,7alpha,24-triol + NADP+ + H2O

The 4 substrates of this enzyme are (24R)-cholest-5-ene-3beta,24-diol, NADPH, H+, and O2, whereas its 3 products are (24R)-cholest-5-ene-3beta,7alpha,24-triol, NADP+, and H2O.

This enzyme belongs to the family of oxidoreductases, specifically those acting on paired donors, with O2 as oxidant and incorporation or reduction of oxygen. The oxygen incorporated need not be derived from O2 with NADH or NADPH as one donor, and incorporation of one atom o oxygen into the other donor. The systematic name of this enzyme class is (24R)-cholest-5-ene-3beta,24-diol,NADPH:oxygen oxidoreductase (7alpha-hydroxylating). Other names in common use include 24-hydroxycholesterol 7alpha-monooxygenase, CYP39A1, and CYP39A1 oxysterol 7alpha-hydroxylase.

See also
 Steroidogenic enzyme

References

External links 
 

EC 1.14.13
NADPH-dependent enzymes
Enzymes of unknown structure